RNA, U4 small nuclear 1 is a protein that in humans is encoded by the RNU4-1 gene.

References

Further reading